Grainsby Halt was a railway halt on the East Lincolnshire Railway which served the hamlet of Grainsby in Lincolnshire between 1905 and 1952. The station, one of the smallest to be taken over by British Railways on nationalisation in 1947, never really justified its existence and closed in 1952 following a period of temporary closure during the Second World War. The line through Grainsby remained open for freight until December 1980.

History
The station was opened on 11 December 1905 to coincide with the introduction of a motor train service by the Great Northern Railway. It consisted of two low facing halt platforms to the south of the level crossing over Grainsby Lane; a small single-storey timber waiting shelter was provided on the up platform. It was not provided with any lighting, which made it very difficult to find on a dark night. A crossing keeper's cottage lay to the north of the crossing. The house was occupied by the Haigh family, Halifax wool merchants who had inherited the estate in 1829. Once the home of George Henry Caton Haigh, the house stood empty for many years and was reputed to be haunted. It was demolished in 1972.

The station, at which trains only called upon request, closed as a temporary wartime measure in 1939. It still figured in timetables for October 1939, 1940 and 1941, but no trains were scheduled to call. The halt reopened after the war on an unknown date, when it was one of the smallest stations to be inherited by British Railways upon nationalisation in 1948. Grainsby Halt never really justified its existence and was closed permanently on 10 March 1952.

Present day

Although the halt remained in a good condition almost ten years after closure, it was subsequently demolished by British Rail before final closure of the line in December 1980. Nothing remains of the halt, although the crossing keeper's cottage was still standing, in a derelict state, in 2006.

On 26 August 2009, the first train between  - the first station to the south from Grainsby - and  ran for the first time in 47 years. It is planned to reopen the line still further through Grainsby as far as Holton-Le-Clay.

Future
The Lincolnshire Wolds Railway aims to eventually (when time and money permit) extend the line, northwards from North Thoresby, through to as far as Holton-le-Clay.

It is however very doubtful that Grainsby halt will ever be reinstated, as the LWR would concentrate on track extension to Holton-le-Clay, however, Grainsby would start off as the temporary limit of the line, before track extension would continue.

The adjacent Level crossing will almost certainly be an Automatic half barrier crossing instead of crossing gates that will be locally monitored by North Thoresby signal box.

The former crossing keeper's house that is standing in its original position to the north of the level crossing is in a dangerous condition and will almost certainly be demolished.

References

Sources

External links
 Grainsby Halt on navigable O. S. map

Disused railway stations in Lincolnshire
Railway stations in Great Britain closed in 1952
Railway stations in Great Britain opened in 1905
Former Great Northern Railway stations
1905 establishments in England
1952 disestablishments in England